The Naval Museum of Halifax (formerly Admiralty House and Maritime Command Museum) is a Canadian Forces museum located at CFB Halifax in the former official residence of the Commander-in-Chief of the North America Station (1819–1905).  Also known as the "Admiralty House", the residence is a National Historic Site of Canada located in Halifax, Nova Scotia, Canada.  The museum collects, preserves and displays the artifacts and history of the Royal Canadian Navy.

Admiralty House

Admiralty House served as the official summer residence of the admiral commanding the North American Station of the British Royal Navy from 1819 to 1905. Construction of the large Palladian Style Georgian house overlooking the Halifax Naval Yard began in 1814. Squadron commanders previously resided aboard a flagship moored at the Naval Yard. The house was completed in 1819 as the summer residence of the Commander-in-Chief of the North American Station, with the squadron shifting its main base during the winter months from Halifax to the Royal Naval Dockyard in Bermuda (where a separate Admiralty House was maintained from 1795 to 1956). The first to live in the residence was Admiral David Milne.

As the residence of one of the most important officials in Halifax, Admiralty House hosted many social and ceremonial events in the 19th century. One of the largest was a ball in 1848 for 600 guests hosted by Admiral Thomas Cochrane, Earl of Dundonald, famous as the inspiration for the fictional characters Horatio Hornblower by C. S. Forester and Jack Aubrey by Patrick O'Brian. Another famous resident of the house was Admiral Francis Austen, brother of the famous novelist Jane Austen. In all, 36 admirals lived in the house, the last being Sir Day Hort Bosanquet.

Admiralty House was taken over by the Canadian government in 1905 as Canada took responsibility for the Halifax Dockyard from the British Royal Navy. In World War I it served as a naval hospital. The roof was blown in by the Halifax Explosion on December 6, 1917. Despite the damage, hospital staff, many of them injured themselves, treated many wounded in the house in the hours after the explosion. After repairs, the house was used as a clinic by the Massachusetts Halifax Relief Commission to assist survivors after the explosion. From 1925 to 1954 it became part of the Royal Canadian Navy base HMCS Stadacona, serving as a Wardroom Officer's Mess and later as office space. In 1961 it became the library for the Royal Canadian Navy and provided classroom space.

Notable Admirals in Residence (1819–1905)

War of 1812 
Two Admirals distinguished themselves during the War of 1812:

Siege of Sevastopol 
Four of the Admirals fought in the renown Siege of Sevastopol (1854–55) during the Crimean War:

Franklin's Lost Expedition 
Two Admirals were involved in the search for Franklin's Lost Expedition:

Other 

 James Hope (Royal Navy officer)
 Sir George Wellesley  (1869–70) (1873–75)

Museum

Admiralty House was officially opened as a museum on March 26, 1974, by Rear Admiral D. S. Boyle. The house was declared a National Historic Site in 1978. The museum underwent extensive renovations in 2009–2010.

The focus is on the history of the Canadian Navy from 1910 to the present, along with the earlier history of the Halifax Dockyard. Highlights include the original bell and a large display of artifacts from HMCS Niobe, the first flagship of the Royal Canadian Navy, and a display of ship's bells and christening bells spanning the history of the Canadian Navy. More than 30 rooms of exhibits are open to the public as well as grounds which display weapons and equipment from the Canadian Navy. The collection consists of uniforms, model ships, medals, badges, ships' bells, armaments, and other equipment of naval life.

The museum also maintains a research library, archives and large photograph collection.

Artifacts

Royal Navy Burying Ground 

The Royal Navy Burying Ground at Halifax has monuments to those served and lost in the medical facility as a result of the capture of USS Chesapeake by HMS Shannon. There are 84 grave markers, but as many as 500 people buried there. There was a tradition where the Commander and Chief of the North America and West Indies Station who lived in Admiralty House created a grave marker for their crew who died while at the station.

Admiralty Garden

On the grounds of the Admiralty House is the Admiralty Garden which was created c. 1814 and has plaques and monuments displayed to honour Admirals and other military personnel.  In 1972 the "Wall of Valour" was created to recognize the bravery decorations awarded to members of the Canadian Navy and the Naval Reserves. Those that are listen received:
Cross of Valour (Canada); Star of Courage (Canada); and the Medal of Bravery (Canada). There are also plaques of Historic Sites and Monuments Board of Canada to commemorate the following Admirals:

 George Edward Watts – War of 1812
 Philip Westphal – War of 1812

Affiliations
The museum is part of a system of 55 museums run by the Canadian Department of National Defence. It is the largest naval museum within the system. The museum is also affiliated with the Canadian Heritage Information Network (CHIN) and works jointly with Nova Scotia's Maritime Museum of the Atlantic to present the naval history of the region.

See also
 Military history of Nova Scotia
 List of oldest buildings and structures in Halifax, Nova Scotia
 Organization of Military Museums of Canada

Notes

References

External links
 

Naval museums in Canada
Historic house museums in Nova Scotia
Museums in Halifax, Nova Scotia
Buildings and structures in Halifax, Nova Scotia
Houses completed in 1819
Museums established in 1974
Georgian architecture in Canada
National Historic Sites in Nova Scotia
1974 establishments in Nova Scotia